Viktor Matveyev (born 21 May 1942) is a Russian equestrian. He competed at the 1968 Summer Olympics and the 1972 Summer Olympics.

References

1942 births
Living people
Russian male equestrians
Soviet male equestrians
Olympic equestrians of the Soviet Union
Equestrians at the 1968 Summer Olympics
Equestrians at the 1972 Summer Olympics
Sportspeople from Yekaterinburg